Daegu Opera House is an opera house located in Buk-gu, Daegu, South Korea.

The opera house is a concrete structure reinforced with steel trusses, and seats 1490 people. The six-story building was constructed between 2000 and 2003, at a total cost of 44 billion won.

References

External links 
 (English pages)

Buildings and structures in Daegu
Opera houses in South Korea
Tourist attractions in Daegu
Theatres completed in 2003
Music venues completed in 2003
2003 establishments in South Korea